Anthony D'Souza (born 2 March 1987) is an Indian professional footballer who plays as a left winger for Goa.

Career

Early career
Born in Siolim, Goa, D'Souza started his football career at the SESA Football Academy before joining the youth team of Sporting Clube de Goa in 2006. During the 2007–08 season he was loaned out to Velsao Pale. D'Souza then made his I-League debut with Sporting Goa on the last day of the 2009–10 I-League season against Chirag United on 28 May 2010 in which he also managed to score his first professional goal as Sporting Goa won 1–0 but were still relegated to the I-League 2nd Division. However, despite relegation, D'Souza stayed on with the club and helped them back to the I-League for the 2011–12 season in which he scored five goals.

D'Souza then signed for Salgaocar in 2012 and during the 2012 Indian Federation Cup scored in all three of the clubs group stage matches to end the tournament as the second top scorer among Indians that year.

Pune
After spending one season at Salgaocar D'Souza signed for Pune F.C. in the I-League on 15 July 2013. He then made his debut for the club on 29 September 2013 against Shillong Lajong when he came on as an 88th-minute substitute for Nikhil Kadam as Pune drew the match 0–0. While training with the India national team in March 2015 D'Souza suffered a severe ankle injury that kept him out for most of the 2015 season.

Churchill Brothers
He made a comeback to football from his ankle injury for Churchill Brothers against Mohun Bagan in second half playing for 35 minutes. He has been used as a second half impact player by coach.

Career statistics

References

External links 
 Pune Football Club Profile.

1987 births
Living people
People from North Goa district
Indian footballers
Sporting Clube de Goa players
Salgaocar FC players
Pune FC players
Association football midfielders
Footballers from Goa
I-League players
I-League 2nd Division players